Análisis Filosófico is a peer-reviewed biannual open access academic journal that publishes scholarly articles on theoretical and practical philosophy "in order to contribute to philosophical analysis development." The journal was established in 1981 as the official journal of the Argentine Society of Analytic Philosophy. The first editor-in-chief of Análisis Filosófico was the Argentine philosopher Eduardo Rabossi. It is available online through SciELO and is indexed in the Philosopher's Index.

The journal, albeit being published in Argentina, is open to contributions from other countries.

See also 
 List of philosophy journals

References

External links 
  
 Análisis filosófico at SciELO

 Philosophy journals
Open access journals
Multilingual journals
Publications established in 1981
Biannual journals